The Shelter may refer to:

 The Shelter, a website dedicated to Francis Schaeffer
 The Shelter (The Twilight Zone), a 1961 episode of the television series The Twilight Zone
 "The Shelter", an episode of the television series Lawman
 The Shelter (New York City), a famed Manhattan dance club
 The Shelter (Detroit, Michigan), a notable music venue in metro Detroit, Michigan

 The Shelter (album), a 2010 album by Jars of Clay
The Shelter, a Mexican rock band

See also
 Shelter (disambiguation)